Muhlenberg Park is a census-designated place in Muhlenberg Township, Berks County, Pennsylvania, United States.  The community is located just to the west of the borough of Laureldale.  As of the 2010 census, the population was 1,420  residents. Development of the community began in 1915.

Demographics

References

Census-designated places in Berks County, Pennsylvania
Census-designated places in Pennsylvania